Steve Butler (born 1956) was an auto racing driver.

Steve Butler may also refer to:

Steve Butler (footballer) (born 1962), English footballer
Steve Butler (mathematician) (born 1977), American mathematician 
Steve Butler (badminton), English badminton player
Stephen Butler (field hockey) in 2009 Men's Hockey Champions Challenge II

See also
Steven Butler (disambiguation)